Earipakkam is a panchayat village in Nettapakkam Commune in the Union Territory of Puducherry, India. It is also a revenue village under Nettapakkam firka.

Geography
Earipakkam is bordered by Kariyamanickam to the west; Kothambakkam, Tamil Nadu to the north; Palli Puthupattu, Tamil Nadu to the east; and Nettapakkam to the south. This village is one of the most famous villages in Puducherry.

Transport
Earipakkam is 26 km from Puducherry, and can be reached directly by buses running between Cuddalore and Villupuram. Alternatively, one can reach the nearby town of Kalmandapam from Pondicherry by taking the Maducarai bus, which travels along the Earipakkam-Maducarai road. Earipakkam is also connected by the Kalmandapam link road.

Politics
Earipakkam is a part of Nettapakkam (Union Territory Assembly constituency) which comes under Puducherry (Lok Sabha constituency).

Gallery

References

External links
 Official website of the Government of the Union Territory of Puducherry

Villages in Puducherry district